The 2021 World Pool Masters was a nine-ball pool tournament which took place in Gibraltar from 22–25 May 2021. It was the 27th edition of the World Pool Masters invitational tournament organised by Matchroom Pool. 2019's runner-up Alexander Kazakis won the event, defeating former winner Shane Van Boening in the final 9–0. The reigning champion was David Alcaide, but he was defeated in his first match by Skyler Woodward.

Format
The event was played as a single elimination tournament, with players competing in a preliminary round based on rankings. The tournament prize fund was the same as of the last edition, with a total prize fund of $100,000. The event winner was awarded $25,000. The total prize money awarded is listed below:

Main draw
The following table denotes the event's draw and results. Numbers to the left of a player's names indicates their seeding, whilst bolding indicates the winner of a match.

References

External links
 Official website

2021
World Pool Masters
World Pool Masters
World Pool Masters
World Pool Masters